Mark Acheson (born September 19, 1957) is a Canadian voice, film and television actor.

Career
Acheson began studying acting at Langara College’s Studio 58 at the age of 15. He is a founding member of Janus Theatre and appeared on stage for eight years including a full season at the Arts Club as well as  The NewPlay center, Carousel Theatre, Western Canada Theatre in Kamloops, Sunshine Theatre in Kelowna, The Belfry in Victoria and StageWest in Edmonton. In his 30s, he started an extensive career in film and television, mostly in supporting roles.  Some of his most notable roles are the Mailroom Guy in Elf and  Mr. Tripoli in Fargo. His other film credits include The 13th Warrior and Watchmen.

Acheson has also amassed a large body of work in voice acting, where he tends to be cast as villains. He voiced the characters of Lord Tirek from My Little Pony: Friendship Is Magic, Sabretooth from Hulk Vs. Wolverine, and has provided the voice of many characters in the TV show Transformers.

Filmography

Animation
 Fat Dog Mendoza (1998, TV Series) as Fat Dog
 Weird-Oh's (1999, TV Series) as Leaky Boat Louie
 Donner (2001, TV Series) as Blitzen / Cupid / Santa Claus
 Alienators: Evolution Continues (2001-2002, TV Series) as SCOPES
 The Amazing Zorro (2002, TV Series) as Don Carlos Pulido
 Stargate Infinity (2002-2003, TV Series) as Da'Kyll
 He-Man and the Masters of the Universe (2003-2004, TV Series) as Fisto / Chadaz
 Fantastic Four: World's Greatest Heroes (2006, TV Series) as Attuma
 Class of the Titans (2007, TV Series) as Orion
 Barbie and the Diamond Castle (2008) as Slyder
 Hot Wheels Battle Force 5 (2009) as Rawkus
 Hulk Vs (2009) as Sabretooth
 Dinosaur Train (2013, TV Series) as Marvin Mosasaurus
 My Little Pony: Friendship is Magic (2014-2019, TV Series) as Lord Tirek
 Tobot (2018) as Giga 7

Anime Dubbing
Roles which were originally voiced in other languages by other people for whom Acheson provided English dubbing:
 Transformers: Armada (2002-2003) as Unicron
 Transformers: Energon (2004) as Unicron / Narrator
 Transformers: Cybertron (2005) as Crumplezone
 .hack//Roots (2006) as Tawalaya / Touta
 Black Lagoon (2006) as Boris, Hotel Moscow Soldier
 The Little Prince (2010) as Lux

Live-action

 Skip Tracer (1977) as Bob Sheldon
 Home Is Where the Hart Is (1987) as Cafe Customer
 Stingray
 The Trial of the Incredible Hulk (1989, TV Movie) as 'Turk'
 Quarantine (1989) as Guard #2
 Look Who's Talking Now (1993) as Burly Dad
 The Crush (1993) as Locksmith
 Highlander: The Series (1993-1994, TV Series) as Laszlo / Billy Ray
 Samurai Cowboy (1994) as Flint Clayton
 Bulletproof Heart (1994) as Hellbig
 The NeverEnding Story III (1994) as Janitor
 Suspicious Agenda (1995) as DeBaker
 Magic in the Water (1995) as 'Lefty' Hardy
 Dad's Week Off (1997, TV Movie) as Sobbing Man
 Exception to the Rule (1997) as Burt Ramsey
 True Heart (1997) as Red Head Man
 Stargate SG-1 (1998, TV Series) as Vishnoor
 I'll Be Home for Christmas (1998) as Sandwich Passenger
 The 13th Warrior (1999) as Norseman
 Reindeer Games (2000) as Mean Guard
 Screwed (2000) as Mr. Kettle
 Trixie (2000) as Vince DeFlore
 The Proposal (2001) as Jules
 3000 Miles to Graceland (2001) as Dockmaster
 Voyage of the Unicorn (2001, TV Series) as Kalgar
 Lola (2001) as Club Owner
 Dead Heat (2002) as Warehouse Worker
 Spymate (2003) as Rocco
 Elf (2003) as Mailroom Guy
 The Chronicles of Riddick (2004) as Slam Guard
 Smallville (2004, TV Series) as Magistrate Wilkins
 Alone in the Dark (2005) as Captain Chernick
 She's the Man (2006) as Groundskeeper
 Love and Other Dilemmas (2006) as Rocco
 Numb (2007) as Homeless Guy
 Hot Rod (2007) as Homeless Dude
 Watchmen (2009) as Large Man At Happy Harry's
 Supernatural (2009-2015, TV Series) as Hansel / Tooth Fairy
 Garage Sale Mystery (2013, TV Series) as Pawn Clerk
 Lawrence & Holloman (2013) as Burly Guy In Jail
 Once Upon a Time in Wonderland (2013, TV Series) as Nazim
 Into the Grizzly Maze (2015) as Dooly
 The Cleanse (2016) as Zatik
 Marrying the Family (2016) as Hal
 1922 (2017) as Pawn Shop Clerk

English dubbing roles

Animation
 .hack//Roots as Tawalaya / Touta
 Black Lagoon as Boris, Hotel Moscow Soldier
 The Little Prince as Lux in "The Planet of Cublix" arc
 Transformers: Armada as Unicron
 Transformers: Cybertron as Crumplezone
 Transformers: Energon as Unicron / Narrator
 Glitter Force Doki Doki as Proto Mercenare

Video games
 Kessen as Yoshihiro Shimazu
 Marvel Nemesis: Rise of the Imperfects as Brigade

References

External links
 
 

Living people
Canadian male film actors
Canadian male television actors
Canadian male voice actors
Male actors from Edmonton
Male actors from Vancouver
Studio 58 people
1957 births